Anti-discrimination laws in Australia have been enacted at both federal and state/territory levels to outlaw discrimination and harassment in a range of areas of public life. Federal law operate concurrently with state/territory laws, so both sets of laws must be followed.

Federal law
The Parliament of Australia has enacted a number of anti-discrimination laws relying on the external affairs power of the Australian Constitution. These include:
Age Discrimination Act 2004
Disability Discrimination Act 1992
Racial Discrimination Act 1975
Sex Discrimination Act 1984

Complaints for unlawful discrimination under one of the federal laws can be made to the Australian Human Rights Commission under the Australian Human Rights Commission Act 1986.

State and territory laws 
Each state and territory has its own anti-discrimination law which operates alongside the federal laws:

Australian Capital Territory – Discrimination Act 1991
New South Wales – Anti-Discrimination Act 1977
Northern Territory – Anti-Discrimination Act 
Queensland – Anti-Discrimination Act 1991
South Australia – Equal Opportunity Act 1984
Tasmania – Anti-Discrimination Act 1998
Victoria – Equal Opportunity Act 2010 and Racial and Religious Tolerance Act 2001
Western Australia – Equal Opportunity Act 1984

References

Law of Australia
Discrimination in Australia